The Sonority Sequencing Principle (SSP) or Sonority Sequencing Constraint is a phonotactic principle that aims to outline the structure of a syllable in terms of sonority.

The SSP states that the syllable nucleus (syllable center), often a vowel, constitutes a sonority peak that is preceded and/or followed by a sequence of segments – consonants – with progressively decreasing sonority values (i.e., the sonority has to fall toward both edges of the syllable). The sonority values of segments are determined by a sonority hierarchy, though these differ to some extent from language to language. Typically they are vowel > glide > liquid > nasal > obstruent (or > fricative > plosive > click). That is, the segment order in a syllable tends to be of the pattern Ʞ-P-F-N-L-G-V-G-L-N-F-P. The fricative–plosive and nasal–plosive rankings may be reversed. Wright (2004: 51–52) notes, 

A good example for the SSP in English is the one-syllable word trust: The first consonant in the syllable onset is t, which is a stop, the lowest on the sonority scale; next is r, a liquid which is more sonorous, then we have the vowel u  – the sonority peak; next, in the syllable coda, is s, a sibilant, and last is another stop, t. The SSP explains why, for example, "trend" is a valid English word but *rtedn (flipping the order of consonants) is not. Language processing has also been shown experimentally to be sensitive to sonority violations.

Some languages possess syllables that violate the SSP (Russian and dialectal Arabic, for example) while other languages strictly adhere to it, even requiring larger intervals on the sonority scale: In Italian for example, a syllable-initial stop must be followed by either a liquid, a glide or a vowel, but not by a fricative (except: [ps] borrowed words like:). Some languages allow a sonority "plateau"; that is, two adjacent tautosyllabic consonants with the same sonority level. Modern Hebrew is an example of such language.

A number of Indo-European languages that typically follow the SSP will violate it with /s/ + stop clusters. For example, in the English word string or Italian  the more sonorous /s/ comes before a less sonorous sound in the onset. In native English words, no phoneme other than /s/ ever violates the SSP. Latin also was able to violate the principle in this way, however the Vulgar Latin dialects that evolved into the Western Romance languages lost this ability, causing the process of I-prosthesis to occur, whereby an /i/ was inserted at the beginning of such a word, to make the /s/ instead a coda consonant rather than an onset consonant.

However, all of the sonority violations noted above occur at word edges, not word-internally. Therefore, some recent phonological accounts postulate that the segments outside of the sonority sequencing may be considered "extrasyllabic consonants", consonants occurring outside of any syllable, and licensed in their language by the word they are part of. English string, for example, would then contain a syllable [tring] with a preceding extrasyllabic s.

Sources

Phonology
Phonotactics